Clothier was a brig launched at Barmouth in 1800. A French privateer captured and burnt her in March 1807.

Clothier first appeared in Lloyd's Register (LR) in (1800).

In March 1807 the French privateer General Perpignon captured and burnt Clothier, Edwards, master, off Rochefort. Clothier was a victualer serving the British blockading squadron.

Citations

1800 ships
Age of Sail merchant ships of England
Captured ships
Maritime incidents in 1807